Soovälja is a village in Lääneranna Parish, Pärnu County in Estonia.

References

Villages in Pärnu County